The 1985 Big East baseball tournament was held at Muzzy Field in Bristol, Connecticut. As a result, St. John's earned the Big East Conference's automatic bid to the 1985 NCAA Division I baseball tournament.

Format and seeding 
The 1985 Big East baseball tournament was a 4 team double elimination tournament. The top two teams from each division, based on conference winning percentage only, earned berths in the tournament. Each division winner played the opposite division's runner up in the first round.

Tournament 

* - Indicates game required extra innings.

All-Tournament Team 
The following players were named to the All-Tournament team.

Jack Kaiser Award 
Joe Armeni was the winner of the 1985 Jack Kaiser Award. Armeni was a shortstop for Seton Hall.

References 

Tournament
Big East Conference Baseball Tournament
Big East Conference baseball tournament
Big East Conference baseball tournament
Bristol, Connecticut
College baseball tournaments in Connecticut
Sports competitions in Hartford County, Connecticut